Uno Dos Tres 1•2•3 is an album by jazz percussionist Willie Bobo recorded in 1966 and released on the Verve label.

Reception

The AllMusic review by Richie Unterberger awarded the album 3 stars, stating "As with his previous album Spanish Grease, the toughest and most memorable track is the one Bobo original, 'Fried Neck Bones and Some Home Fries.' Its creeping Latin soul groove was, like 'Spanish Grease,' an obvious inspiration for Carlos Santana".

Track listing
 "Boogaloo in Room 802" (John Hart, Melvin Lastie) - 2:35
 "Come a Little Bit Closer" (Tommy Boyce, Bobby Hart, Wes Farrell) - 2:28
 "Goin' Out of My Head" (Teddy Randazzo, Bobby Weinstein) - 3:26
 "I Remember Clifford" (Benny Golson) - 2:04
 "Rescue Me" (Raynard Miner, Carl Smith) - 3:08
 "Michelle" (John Lennon, Paul McCartney) - 3:16
 "No Matter What Shape (Your Stomach's In)" (Granville Burland) - 2:43
 "Fried Neck Bones and Some Homefries" (Willie Bobo, Melvin Lastie) - 3:01
 "Ol' Man River" (Oscar Hammerstein II, Jerome Kern) - 3:11
 "One, Two, Three (Uno, Dos, Tres)" (Len Barry, John Medora, David White) - 2:38
 "Night Song" (Lee Adams, Charles Strouse) - 2:43
 "The Breeze and I" (Ernesto Lecuona) - 3:16  
Recorded at Van Gelder Studio on January 26 (tracks 8 & 10), April 25 (tracks 2 & 5-7), and April 26 (tracks 1, 3, 4, 6, 9, 11 & 12), 1966

Personnel
Willie Bobo – timbales
Melvin Lastie – cornet
Bobby Brown – alto saxophone, tenor saxophone
Clarence "Sonny" Henry – guitar
John Hart, Bobby Rodriguez – bass
Carlos "Patato" Valdes – congas
Osvaldo Martinez – bongos, guiro
Jose Mangual, Victor Pantoja – percussion

References

Verve Records albums
Willie Bobo albums
1966 albums
Albums produced by Creed Taylor
Albums recorded at Van Gelder Studio